China National Highway 224 runs from Haikou in Hainan to Sanya, Hainan. It is 309 kilometres in length. It is the middle part of Hainan Ring Highway.

Route and distance

See also 

 China National Highways

Transport in Hainan
224